The Jeddah Corniche Circuit is a  motor racing circuit built in the Red Sea port city of Jeddah, in Saudi Arabia. The circuit staged the inaugural Saudi Arabian Grand Prix on 5 December 2021 as the penultimate race on the  Formula One season calendar.

History 

Additionally, three consecutive sections of the circuit have been marked out as potential DRS zones.

The circuit is located on the Jeddah Corniche adjoining the Red Sea. The circuit was designed by Carsten Tilke, son of the famed circuit designer, Hermann Tilke.

In November 2022, Jeddah hosted the season finale of 2022 World Touring Car Cup and also the last race of WTCR history. Instead of the Grand Prix layout, shorter  layout was configured for that race.

Lap records
The official race lap records at the Jeddah Corniche Circuit are listed as:

References 

2021 establishments in Saudi Arabia
Motorsport venues in Saudi Arabia
Sport in Jeddah
Saudi Arabian Grand Prix
Formula One circuits
World Touring Car Championship circuits